The Consulate was the top-level Government of France from the fall of the Directory in the coup of 18 Brumaire on 10 November 1799 until the start of the Napoleonic Empire on 18 May 1804. By extension, the term The Consulate also refers to this period of French history.

During this period, Napoleon Bonaparte, as First Consul, established himself as the head of a more authoritarian, autocratic, and centralized republican government in France while not declaring himself sole ruler. Due to the long-lasting institutions established during these years, Robert B. Holtman has called the Consulate "one of the most important periods of all French history." By the end of this period, Napoleon had engineered authoritarian personal rule which has been viewed as military dictatorship.

Fall of the Directory government 

French military disasters in 1798 and 1799 had shaken the Directory, and eventually shattered it in November 1799. Historians sometimes date the start of the political downfall of the Directory to 18 June 1799 (Coup of 30 Prairial VII by the French Republican calendar). This was when anti-Jacobin Director Emmanuel-Joseph Sieyès, after only a month in office, with the help of the Directory's only surviving original member, Paul Barras, also an anti-Jacobin, successfully rid himself of the other three then-sitting directors. The March–April 1799 elections to the two councils had produced a new Neo-Jacobin majority in the two bodies, and being unhappy with the existing five man Directory, by 5 June 1799, these councils had found an irregularity in the election of the Director Jean Baptiste Treilhard, who thus retired in favor of Louis Jérôme Gohier, a Jacobin more 'in tune' with the feelings in the two councils. The very next day, 18 June 1799, the anti-Jacobins Philippe-Antoine Merlin (Merlin de Douai) and Louis-Marie de La Revellière-Lépeaux were also driven to resign, although one long time anti-Jacobin, popularly known for his cunning, survived the day's coup; they were replaced by the Jacobin Baron Jean-François-Auguste Moulin and by the non-Jacobin, or 'weak' Jacobin, Roger Ducos. The three new directors were generally seen by the anti-Jacobin elite of France as non-entities, a 'put-down' if ever there was one, but that same elite could take some comfort in knowing that the five man Directory was still in anti-Jacobin hands, but with a reduced majority.

A few more military disasters, royalist insurrections in the south, Chouan disturbances in a dozen departments of the western part of France (mainly in Brittany, Maine and eventually Normandy), Orléanist intrigues, and the end became certain. In order to soothe the populace and protect the frontier, more than the French Revolution's usual terrorist measures (such as the law of hostages) was necessary. The new Directory government, led by the anti-Jacobin Sieyès, decided that the necessary revision of the constitution would require "a head" (his own) and "a sword" (a general to back him). Jean Victor Moreau being unattainable as his sword, Sieyès favoured Barthélemy Catherine Joubert; but, when Joubert was killed at the Battle of Novi (15 August 1799), he turned to General Napoleon Bonaparte.

Although Guillaume Marie Anne Brune and André Masséna won the Battles of Bergen and of Zürich, and although the Allies of the Second Coalition lingered on the frontier as they had done after the Battle of Valmy, still the fortunes of the Directory were not restored. Success was reserved for Bonaparte, suddenly landing at Fréjus with the prestige of his victories in the East, and now, after Hoche's death (1797), appearing as sole master of the armies.

In the coup of 18 Brumaire Year VIII (9 November 1799), Napoleon seized French parliamentary and military power in a two-fold coup d'état, forcing the sitting directors of the government to resign. On the night of the 19 Brumaire (10 November 1799) a remnant of the Council of Ancients abolished the Constitution of the Year III, ordained the consulate, and legalised the coup d'Etat in favour of Bonaparte with the Constitution of the Year VIII.

The new government  

The initial 18 Brumaire coup seemed to be a victory for Sieyès, rather than for Bonaparte. Sieyès was a proponent of a new system of government for the Republic, and the coup initially seemed certain to bring his system into force. Bonaparte's cleverness lay in counterposing Pierre Claude François Daunou's plan to that of Sieyès, and in retaining only those portions of each which could serve his ambition.

The new government was composed of three parliamentary assemblies: the Council of State which drafted bills, the Tribunate which could not vote on the bills but instead debated them, and the Corps législatif, whose members could not discuss the bills but voted on them after reviewing the Tribunate's debate record. The Sénat conservateur was a governmental body equal to the three aforementioned legislative assemblies and verified the draft bills and directly advised the First Consul on the implications of such bills.  Ultimate executive authority was vested in three consuls, who were elected for ten years.  Popular suffrage was retained, though mutilated by the lists of notables (on which the members of the Assemblies were to be chosen by the Senate).  The four aforementioned governmental organs were retained under the Constitution of the Year XII, which recognized Napoleon as the French sovereign Emperor, but their respective powers were greatly diminished.

Napoleon vetoed Sieyès' original idea of having a single Grand Elector as supreme executive and Head of State.  Sieyès had intended to reserve this important position for himself, and by denying him the job Napoleon helped reinforce the authority of the consuls, an office which he would assume. Nor was Napoleon content simply to be part of an equal triumvirate. As the years would progress he would move to consolidate his own power as First Consul, and leave the two other consuls, Jean Jacques Régis de Cambacérès and Charles-François Lebrun, as well as the Assemblies, weak and subservient.

By consolidating power, Bonaparte was able to transform the aristocratic constitution of Sieyès into an unavowed dictatorship.

On 7 February 1800, a public referendum confirmed the new constitution.  It vested all of the real power in the hands of the First Consul, leaving only a nominal role for the other two consuls. A full 99.9% of voters approved the motion, according to the released results.

He gave everyone a feeling that France was governed once more by a real statesman, and that a competent government was finally in charge.

Napoleon's consolidation of power 

Bonaparte needed to rid himself of Sieyès and of those republicans who had no desire to hand over the republic to one man, particularly of Moreau and Masséna, his military rivals. The victory of Marengo (14 June 1800) momentarily in the balance, but secured by Desaix and Kellermann, offered a further opportunity to his ambition by increasing his popularity. The royalist plot of the Rue Saint-Nicaise on 24 December 1800 allowed him to make a clean sweep of the democratic republicans, who despite their innocence were deported to French Guiana. He annulled the Assemblies and made the Senate omnipotent in constitutional matters.

The Treaty of Lunéville, signed in February 1801 with Austria (which had been disarmed by ’s victory at ), restored peace to Europe, gave nearly the whole of Italy to France, and permitted  to eliminate from the Assemblies all the leaders of the opposition in the discussion of the Civil Code. The Concordat of 1801, drawn up not in the Church's interest but in that of his own policy, by giving satisfaction to the religious feeling of the country, allowed him to put down the constitutional democratic Church, to rally round him the consciences of the peasants, and above all to deprive the royalists of their best weapon. The  hid from the eyes of his companions-in-arms and councillors a reaction which, in fact if not in law, restored to a submissive Church, despoiled of her revenues, her position as the religion of the state.

The Peace of Amiens (25 March 1802) with the United Kingdom, of which France's allies, Spain and the Batavian Republic, paid all the costs, finally gave the peacemaker a pretext for endowing himself with a Consulate, not for ten years but for life, as a recompense from the nation. The Rubicon was crossed on that day: ’s march to empire began with the Constitution of the Year X dated 16 Thermidor or 4 August 1802.

On 2 August 1802 (14 Thermidor, An X), a second national referendum was held, this time to confirm  as "First Consul for Life." Once again, a vote claimed 99.7% approval.

Like the old monarchy, he re-introduced plenipotentiaries; over-centralised, strictly utilitarian administrative and bureaucratic methods, and a policy of subservient pedantic scholasticism towards the nation's universities. He constructed or consolidated the funds necessary for national institutions, local governments, a judiciary system, organs of finance, banking, codes, traditions of conscientious well-disciplined labour force.

France enjoyed a high level of peace and order under  that helped to raise the standard of comfort. Prior to this, Paris had often suffered from hunger and thirst, and lacked fire and light, but under Napoleon, provisions became cheap and abundant, while trade prospered and wages ran high.

The expedition to Saint-Domingue reduced the republican army to a nullity. Constant war helped demoralise and scatter the military's leaders, who were jealous of their "comrade" .

In contradistinction to the opposition of senators and republican generals, the majority of the French populace remained uncritical of 's authority. No suggestion of the possibility of his death was tolerated. The Napoleonic age began here when he became officer of the French state and established the consulate.

The Duke of Enghien affair 

Because Napoleon's hold on political power was still tenuous, French Royalists devised a plot that involved kidnapping and assassinating him and inviting Louis Antoine de Bourbon, the Duke of Enghien, to lead a coup d'état that would precede the restoration of the Bourbon monarchy with Louis XVIII on the throne. The British government of William Pitt the Younger had contributed to this Royalist conspiracy by financing one million pounds and providing naval transport (with the ship of Captain John Wesley Wright) to the conspirators Georges Cadoudal and General Charles Pichegru for their return to France from England.  Pichegru met Jean Victor Marie Moreau, one of Napoleon's generals and a former protege of Pichegru, on 28 January 1804. The next day, a British secret agent named Courson was arrested and he, under torture, confessed that Pichegru, Moreau and Cadoudal were conspiring to overthrow the consulate. The French government sought more details of this plot by arresting and torturing Louis Picot, Cadoudal's servant.  Joachim Murat ordered the city gates of Paris to be closed from 7 pm to 6 am while Pichegru and Moreau were arrested during the next month.

These further arrests revealed that the Royalist conspiracy would eventually involve the active participation of the Duke of Enghien, who was a relatively young Bourbon prince and thus another possible heir to a restored Bourbon monarchy. The Duke, at that time, was living as a French émigré in the future Grand Duchy of Baden, but then still the 1803-1806 Electorate of Baden, but he also kept a rented house in Ettenheim, which was close to the French border. Perhaps at the urging of Talleyrand, Napoleon's foreign minister, and Fouché, Napoleon's minister of police who had warned that "the air is full of daggers", the First Consul came to the political conclusion that the Duke must be dealt with. Two hundred French soldiers crossed the border, surrounded the Duke's home in Baden and arrested him.

On the way back to France d'Enghien stated that "he had sworn implacable hatred against Bonaparte as well as against the French; he would take every occasion to make war on them."

After three plots to assassinate him and the further financing of a supposed insurrection in Strasbourg, Napoleon had enough. Based on d'Enghien's who were seized at his home in Germany and the material from the police, d'Enghien was charged as a conspirator in time of war and was subject to a military court. He was ordered to be tried by a court of seven colonels at Vincennes.

D'Enghien during his questioning at the court told them that he was being paid £4,200 per year by England "in order to combat not France but a government to which his birth had made him hostile." Further, he stated that "I asked England if I might serve in her armies, but she replied that that was impossible: I must wait on the Rhine, where I would have a part to play immediately, and I was in fact waiting."

D'Enghien was found guilty of being in violation of Article 2 of a law of 6 October 1791, to wit, "Any conspiracy and plot aimed at disturbing the State by civil war, and arming the citizens against one another, or against lawful authority, will be punished by death." He was executed in the ditch of the fortress of Vincennes.

The aftermath caused hardly a ripple in France, but abroad, it produced a storm of anger. Many of those who had favored or been neutral to Napoleon now turned against him. But Napoleon always assumed full responsibility for allowing the execution and continued to believe that, on balance, he had done the right thing.

Consuls

Ministers

See Cabinet of the French Consulate

The Ministers under the consulate were:

References

Bibliography 

 website (English language version). Accessed October 2006.
Tom Holmberg, "The d'Enghien Affair: Crime or Blunder?" (September 2005), The Napoleonic Series website. Accessed October 2006.
", duke of Enghien"

 
First French Empire
1799 events of the French Revolution
1799 establishments in France
1804 disestablishments in France
1799